Heladiv, publicly traded as HVA Foods PLC, is a tea company based in Sri Lanka.

History
Heladiv commenced operations in 1990 as HVA Lanka Exports Pvt. Ltd., an affiliate of a Dutch-based agricultural development company, Handels Vereniging Amsterdam (The Trading Company of Amsterdam). 

In 1993, the company reverted to 100% Sri Lankan ownership.

In 2001, they introduced the concept of Tetra Paking of Iced Tea to Sri Lanka. In 2007, the company received an ISO 22000 accreditation by Bureau Veritas and was awarded the Lanka Star, for Packaging Excellence from the Sri Lanka Institute of Packaging, and a Soorya Sinha Award from the Mawbima Lanka Padanama.

In 2011, the company was publicly listed on the Sri Lankan stock exchange.

The brand name, Heladiv, is derived from the word "Heladiva", which means our land. The Heladiv product range includes ice tea, regular tea bags, flavoured tea bags, green tea, flavoured green tea, herbal infusions, leaf tea in pouches, pet jars, metal canisters, wooden boxes and gift packs.

The company operates over fifty tea cafes across China and a tea lounge in Colombo. The brand Heladiv is registered and sold in over 40 countries.

In 2014/2015 the company generated a gross profit of Rs 113,838,502.

References

Tea brands
Sri Lankan brands
Tea companies of Sri Lanka
Food and drink companies established in 1990
Companies listed on the Colombo Stock Exchange
Sri Lankan companies established in 1990